Samuel Johnstone Thomson (27 May 1911 – 23 March 1995) was a Scottish amateur sportsman who played football and cricket.

Sporting career

Football 
Thomson played as a centre half in the Scottish League for Queen's Park from 1935 to 1942 and was capped by Scotland at amateur level.

Cricket 
Thomson was a club cricketer for Ferguslie Cricket Club. He made his debut for Scotland in first-class cricket against Ireland at Glasgow in July 1938, with him making a further appearance the following month against Yorkshire at Harrogate as part of Scotland's tour of England. Following the Second World War, he resumed playing first-class cricket for Scotland, making two further appearances. The first came in 1946 against Ireland, while the second came in 1951 against Warwickshire on Scotland's tour of England. In four first-class matches, Thomson scored 75 runs with a highest score of 21 not out. It was as a leg break googly bowler that Thomson had an impact, taking 17 wickets at an average of 14.47; he took one five wicket haul, with figures of 5 for 54 on debut against Ireland.

Personal life 
Thomson was born at Johnstone in May 1911. He was educated at Camphill Secondary School, before matriculating to the University of Glasgow. After graduating, he became a schoolteacher. During the Second World War, he was an emergency commission in the Royal Air Force Volunteer Reserve as a pilot officer on probation in March 1943. In September of the same year, he was promoted to flight officer on probation. Thomson died at Paisley in March 1995.

References

External links

1911 births
1995 deaths
Sportspeople from Renfrewshire
Alumni of the University of Glasgow
Scottish schoolteachers
Scottish footballers
Queen's Park F.C. players
Scottish Football League players
Scotland amateur international footballers
Association football wing halves
Scottish cricketers
Royal Air Force officers
Royal Air Force Volunteer Reserve personnel of World War II